Bear Valley in Colusa County, California is formed by Bear Creek which is a tributary of Cache Creek.

Upstream in the Bear Creek watershed the creek flows for 10 miles through a broad flat valley that has spectacular displays of wildflowers in the spring.

The Bear Valley Ranch and Payne Ranch in Bear Valley have been permanently protected through a conservation easement that precludes development on the property, while permitting traditional cattle ranching to continue.

Hiking through the valley is not permitted, but many people visit Bear Valley and neighboring valleys each spring for roadside viewing of this wildflower hotspot.

References

Protected areas of Colusa County, California